I Am Woman is a 2019 Australian biographical film about singer Helen Reddy, directed and produced by Unjoo Moon, from a screenplay by Emma Jensen. Tilda Cobham-Hervey stars as Reddy alongside Evan Peters, as her manager husband Jeff Wald, and Danielle Macdonald as rock writer Lilian Roxon.

Plot 
The film opens with Reddy, aged 24, arriving in New York in 1966 with her three-year-old daughter, a suitcase and just . Within five years she had become one of the biggest superstars of her time, with eight number one US singles, her own hour-long TV show and an icon of the 1970s feminist movement, which adopted her power anthem. The film follows her troubled relationships with Roxon, author of the influential Lillian Roxon's Rock Encyclopedia, and husband/manager Wald, who also managed such artists as Sylvester Stallone, Donna Summer, Deep Purple and Tiny Tim.

Cast 
 Tilda Cobham-Hervey as Helen Reddy
 Evan Peters as Jeff Wald
 Danielle Macdonald as Lilian Roxon
 Molly Broadstock as Traci
 Coco Greenstone as young Traci
 Chris Parnell as Artie Mogull
 Jordan Raskopoulos as George Sylvia
 Matty Cardarople as Roy Meyer
 Liam Douglas as Jordan
 Chelsea Cullen as the singing voice of Helen Reddy

Production 

Reddy lived in a care facility in LA before her death one month after the film's Australian release, and her family advised the filmmakers on the project. Moon said she felt great responsibility to Helen to ensure the story was told sensitively: "Before we locked the movie off, Producer Rosemary Blight (Goalpost Pictures) and I felt very strongly that we needed to show the movie to Helen and her family. We did a screening for Helen, her ex-husband Jeff Wald, and her two children. As a filmmaker, sitting in the cinema with Helen Reddy was, and it’s probably going to be, one of the hardest screenings I had to do for the film. I suddenly realised that this is her life and she was watching it through my eyes. During the screening, Helen sang along to her songs, and when she cried, it wasn’t because she was sad that we made the movie, she cried because she found the whole experience so touching, and I think really cathartic in a way."

Screen Australia is the principal investor in the film, alongside Cowlick Entertainment, and arts body Create NSW, with further funding from the Goodship Women's Fund, which supports films with strong social change messaging.

Release 
The film had its world premiere at the Toronto International Film Festival on 5 September 2019.

It was shown at the 24th Busan International Film Festival in Busan, South Korea, in October 2019.

The film was chosen to open the 10th annual Athena Film Festival at Barnard College of Columbia University in New York, which celebrates women, on 27 February 2020.

It was reported on 31 March 2020 (before the extent of the COVID-19 pandemic was known) that I Am Woman was scheduled for release in Australia by Transmission Films, in North America through Aqute Media, and elsewhere by Metropolitan (France), Nos (Portugal), Inopia (Spain), Videovision (South Africa), Front Row (Middle East), Bliss Media (China), Scene & Sound (South Korea), Ale Kino+ (Poland), VTI (former Yugoslavia), Cineplex (Taiwan), Golden A Entertainment (Thailand) and Cinesky (airlines).

Premiere screenings were shown at cinemas around Adelaide (star Cobham-Hervey's home town) from 22 to 23 August 2020, presented by the Adelaide Film Festival. It streams throughout Australia on the Stan platform from 28 August 2020.

Critical response
The site's critics consensus reads: "I Am Woman sticks disappointingly close to standard biopic formula, but Tilda Cobham-Hervey's performance keeps this affectionate, watchable tribute from falling flat."

Indiewire declared the film “a cut above other genre entries”, while David Rooney of The Hollywood Reporter described it as “entertaining and sharply packaged” with “considerable appeal”. He said of Cobham-Hervey's performance:  "The crucial thing is that you really root for Helen — to make it in the first place and then to make it through a nightmarish marriage and come out unbroken. The luminous Cobham-Hervey has you in the corner of this smart, pragmatic, quietly driven woman all the way."

Toronto movie review site That Shelf called it a “sure fire crowd pleaser”.

Moon was awarded the Athena Breakthrough Award at the Athena Film Festival.

Accolades

Soundtrack

A soundtrack was released by Goalpost and distributed by Sony Music Australia in August 2020. It was produced by Bry Jones and Michael Tan, and features Chelsea Cullen who provided the singing voice of Reddy in the film.

At the 2020 ARIA Music Awards it won ARIA Award for Best Original Soundtrack, Cast or Show Album.

Track listing

References

External links
 

2019 films
2019 biographical drama films
2010s English-language films
2010s feminist films
2010s musical drama films
Australian biographical drama films
Australian musical drama films
Biographical films about singers
Cultural depictions of Australian women
Cultural depictions of pop musicians
Films set in the 1960s
Films set in 1966
Films set in the 1970s
Films set in 1989
Films set in the Las Vegas Valley
Films set in Los Angeles
Films set in New York City
Films set in Washington, D.C.
Helen Reddy
Musical films based on actual events
Screen Australia films
Stan (service) original films